A query letter is a formal letter sent to magazine editors, literary agents and sometimes publishing houses or companies. Writers write query letters to propose writing ideas.

For example, a standard requested format for a manuscript query letter to a literary agent could be approximately 200–400 words, expressing the following information:
 The topic of the work
 A short description of the plot
 A short bio of the author
 The target audience
The literary agent would then decide whether to contact the author and request to see the manuscript, based on the contents of the query letter. In this sense, the query letter is an author's first step toward getting their manuscript published.

See also
 Literary Agent
 Publishing

Book publishing